The House of Venier was a prominent family in the Republic of Venice who entered the Venetian nobility in the 14th century.

Notable members 
Pietro Venier (died 8 May 1372) who was the Governor of Cerigo
Antonio Venier (circa 1330 - 23 November 1400) who was Doge of Venice from October 1382 until his death.
Andrea Venier (fl. 15th century) a provveditore of Venetian Albania
Lorenzo Venier, a Dominican friar, was appointed Archbishop of Zadar, Croatia, on 19 Jan 1428 and was succeeded in 1449. He had previously been in the bishopric of Modon. 
Alvise Venier was elected to the lifetime position of Procuratore di San Marco de Citra Canale on 12 Jan. 1444 and replaced 15 Jan. 1452
Michiel Venier was elected to the lifetime position of Procuratore di San Marco de Supra Canale on 2 Jan. 1450 and replaced 2 April 1463
Deodato Venier was a canon at the cathedral of Zadar, now Croatia, and became Abbot of San Crisogono (a Benedictine abbey belonging to the reformed congregation of Santa Giustina), in Zadar, 1459-1488 (according to M. Pelc). He was convicted of a number of crimes but soon absolved of them. He commissioned four liturgical books for the abbey, decorated probably in Venice, that still survive.
Francesco Venier, appointed podestà (city ruler, or minister of justice) of Padua for a term of one year by Doge Christoforo Moro, Venice, 1 Oct. 1470  Francesco Venier, presumably the same person, was elected to the lifetime position of Procuratore di San Marco de Ultra Canale on 27 Dec. 1475 and was replaced 20 Jan. 1486
Antonio Venier was elected to the lifetime position of Procuratore di San Marco de Supra Canale on 13 Jan 1472 and was replaced on 13 Nov. 1474
Benedetto Venier was elected Procuratore di San Marco de Citra Canale on 31 Dec. 1475 and was replaced March 14, 1487.
Bernardo Venier "fu de ser Giacomo" was podestà of Padua in 1476 
Antonio Venier fu de ser Dolfin was podestà of Padua in 1485  Antonio Venier, presumably the same person, was elected to the lifetime position of Procuratore di San Marco de Supra Canale 1 March 1489 and replaced 27 March 1492
Marin Venier fu de ser Alvise Procurator was podestà of Padua in 1492 Marin Venier, presumably the same person, was elected to the lifetime position of Procuratore di San Marco de Supra Canale on 23 Dec. 1501 and resigned 20 Jan. 1502
Andrea Venier was elected Procuratore di San Marco de Supra Canale on 28 July 1509 and was replaced on June 17 1513
Marcantonio Venier was elected to the lifetime position of Procuratore di San Marco de Citra Canale on March 17 1554 and replaced April 6 1556
Francesco Venier was Doge of Venice from 1554 to 1556.
Bernardò Venier was elected to the lifetime position of Procuratore di San Marco de Citra Canale on Aug. 9, 1557, and replaced on 23 Oct. 1559
Sebastiano Venier (c. 1496 – March 3, 1578) was Doge of Venice from June 11, 1577 to March 3, 1578. He had been an admiral of the Venetian fleet and was one of the protagonists in the 1571 Battle of Lepanto
Nicolò Venier was elected to the lifetime position of Procuratore di San Marco de Citra Canale on 24 Feb. 1579 and replaced 20 Oct. 1587
The Peggy Guggenheim Collection in Venice is housed in the Palazzo Venier dei Leoni, and the Croatian town of Vinjerac (once Castel Venier) takes its name from the family.

Sources

References